Reynold B. Johnson (July 16, 1906September 15, 1998) was an American inventor and computer pioneer. A long-time employee of IBM, Johnson is said to be the "father" of the hard disk drive. Other inventions include automatic test scoring equipment and the videocassette tape.

Biography
A native of Minnesota, born to Swedish immigrants, Johnson graduated from Minnehaha Academy (1925) and went on to graduate from the University of Minnesota (BS in Educational Administration, 1929).

In the early 1930s, Johnson, then a high school science teacher in Michigan, invented an electronic test scoring machine that sensed pencil marks on a standardized form. IBM bought the rights to Reynold's invention and hired him as an engineer to work in their Endicott, New York laboratory. The test scoring machine was sold as the IBM 805 Test Scoring Machine beginning in 1937.

One of Reynold's early assignments was to develop technology that allowed cards marked with pencil marks to be converted into punched cards. That allowed punched card data to be recorded by people using only a pencil. That "mark sense" technology was widely used by businesses in the 1940s, 50s, and 60s. For example, the Bell System used mark sense technology to record long-distance calls, and utility companies used it to record meter readings. The Federal Government used it under the name "electrographic" technology.

In 1952, IBM sent Johnson to San Jose, California, to set up and manage its West Coast Laboratory. In 1956, a research team led by Johnson developed disk data storage technology, which IBM released as the IBM 305 RAMAC. Although the first disk drive was crude by modern standards, it launched a multibillion-dollar industry.

Johnson was working with Sony on another project when he developed the prototype for a half-inch videocassette tape. Lou Stevens noted that "Sony was using wider tape on reels. He cut the tape to a half an inch, and put it in a cartridge. The larger tapes weren't easy enough for kids to use, and his interest was in education and building a video textbook for kids."

Johnson retired from IBM in 1971. He obtained more than 90 patents. After his retirement, he developed the microphonograph technology used in the Fisher-Price "Talk to Me Books."  The Talk to Me Books won a Toy of the Year award. This technology was also used by the National Audubon Society to aid bird watchers with songbird identification. He received the National Medal of Technology and Innovation from President Ronald Reagan in 1986.

The IEEE Reynold B. Johnson Information Storage Systems Award was established in 1991, and is each year presented to a small team or an individual that has made outstanding contributions to information storage systems.

Johnson was awarded the Franklin Institute's Certificate of Merit in 1996.

Johnson died in 1998, at the age of 92, of melanoma at Palo Alto, California.

References

Further reading
 
 
 
 Memorial Tributes: National Academy of Engineering, Volume 9 (2001)

1906 births
1998 deaths
IBM Fellows
IBM Research computer scientists
IBM employees
People from Minnesota
University of Minnesota College of Education and Human Development alumni
People from San Jose, California
National Medal of Technology recipients
20th-century American inventors
American people of Swedish descent
Inventors from Minnesota